The 2022 Arkansas Attorney General election was held on November 8, 2022, to elect the next attorney general of Arkansas. Incumbent Republican Attorney General Leslie Rutledge won re-election on November 6, 2018 to a second term. She was term-limited and had announced a campaign for Lieutenant Governor of Arkansas in 2022 Primary elections were held on May 24, 2022.

Republican primary

Candidates

Nominee 

Eliminated in primary 
 Leon Jones Jr., Attorney, Director of the Arkansas Department of Labor, (2015–2019) and Director of the Arkansas Fair Housing Commission (2019–2021)

Endorsements

Polling

Results

Democratic primary

Candidates

Nominee 
 Jesse Gibson, attorney and President of the Arkansas Trial Lawyers Association (2018–2019)

Withdrawn 
 Jason Davis, lawyer

Independents

Candidates

Declared 
 Gerhard Langguth, former chair of the Libertarian Party of Arkansas (write-in)

General election

Predictions

Endorsements

Polling

Results

See also 
 2022 United States attorney general elections
 2022 Arkansas elections

Notes 

Partisan clients

References

External links 
Official campaign websites
 Jesse Gibson (D) for Attorney General
 Tim Griffin (R) for Attorney General

Attorney General
Arkansas
Arkansas Attorney General elections